Robert Gordon Sharman-Crawford PC (8 September 1853 – 20 March 1934) was a unionist politician in Northern Ireland.

Sharman-Crawford studied at Trinity College, Dublin before becoming an officer in the British Army and managing the family estates. He served in the 16th Lancers until he resigned from regular service, and on 2 December 1898 was appointed lieutenant-colonel of the 3rd (Militia) battalion of the Royal Irish Rifles. He was granted the honorary rank of colonel on 14 February 1900.

He was elected for the Ulster Unionist Party at the Belfast East by-election in April 1914, although the seat was abolished in 1918.  He returned to Parliament at the Mid Down by-election in July 1921 but, the following year, this seat was also abolished.  In 1921, he was also elected to the Senate of Northern Ireland, and served until his death in 1934.

References

External links 
 
 

1853 births
1934 deaths
Alumni of Trinity College Dublin
Members of the Senate of Northern Ireland 1921–1925
Members of the Senate of Northern Ireland 1925–1929
Members of the Senate of Northern Ireland 1929–1933
Members of the Senate of Northern Ireland 1933–1937
Members of the Parliament of the United Kingdom for County Down constituencies (1801–1922)
UK MPs 1918–1922
Ulster Unionist Party members of the House of Commons of the United Kingdom
Members of the Privy Council of Ireland
Members of the Parliament of the United Kingdom for Belfast constituencies (1801–1922)
16th The Queen's Lancers officers
Ulster Unionist Party members of the Senate of Northern Ireland